General Kārlis Goppers (April 2, 1876, Plāņi parish (now Valmoera Municipality) – March 25, 1941 at Ulbroka) was a Latvian military officer and the founder and President of Latvijas Skautu un Gaidu Centrālā Organizācija (Latvian Scout and Guide Central Organization). He was the commander of the 7th Bauska riflemen regiment during World War I and commander of the Vidzeme division of the Latvian army, from 1924 to April 1934, when he retired.

Background

In 1940, after the Soviet occupation of Latvia, a special officer was appointed by the communists to abolish Scouting. "The Soviet repressive authorities regarded all organizations and parties of independent Latvia, including the Boy Scouts, as fascist or counterrevolutionary", concluded a University of Latvia study in 2005. Scouting continued unofficially and underground, operating without uniforms and in the forests to avoid detection. Shortly before Goppers' arrest, he said farewell to his Scouting colleagues:  On 30 September 1940, the NKVD arrested General Goppers. He was sentenced to death after a show trial and on 25 March 1941, he was shot on NKVD premises 61 Brivibas Street, buried in the mass grave in Ulbroka (Stopiņi) together with other victims of the shooting. In May 1944, he was reburied in the Riga Brothers Cemetery, but his heart was buried in his native Trikata (Trikāta Cemetery).

Goppers is recipient of the Latvian military Order of Lāčplēsis, 2nd class. In 1939, he received Scouting's Silver Wolf Award from the movement's founder, Robert Baden-Powell, for his leadership in Latvia.

See also 

 List of Latvian Army generals

References

External links
 Ēriks Jēkabsons, «100 Latvijas personības» — Konservatīvais ģenerālis, «Latvijas Avīze» (in Latvian)
 Scouting Round the World, John S. Wilson, first edition, Blandford Press 1959 p. 116
 http://forum.valka.cz/viewtopic.php/title/Goppers-Karlis/t/64752

1876 births
1941 deaths
People from Strenči Municipality
People from Kreis Walk
Latvian generals
Scouting pioneers
Scouting and Guiding in Latvia
Imperial Russian Army officers
Latvian Riflemen
Russian military personnel of World War I
Soviet military personnel of the Russian Civil War
White movement people
Recipients of the Order of Lāčplēsis, 2nd class
Recipients of the Order of the Three Stars
Latvian people executed by the Soviet Union